The 74th District of the Iowa House of Representatives in the state of Iowa.

Current elected officials
David Jacoby is the representative currently representing the district.

Past representatives
The district has previously been represented by:
 Charles H. Pelton, 1971–1973
 William J. Hargrave, 1973–1979
 Dale W. Hibbs, 1979–1981
 Minnette Doderer, 1981–1983
 Johnie Hammond, 1983–1993
 Dorothy Carpenter, 1993–1995
 Libby Jacobs, 1995–2003
 Mark Davitt, 2003–2009
 Kent Sorenson, 2009–2011
 Glen Massie, 2011–2013
 David Jacoby, 2013–present

References

074